Kid Marine is the third solo studio album by American indie rock musician Robert Pollard, released in 1999.  It is the first release of Robert Pollard's Fading Captain Series.

Background 
Pollard has stated that the album is about Jeff "Kid Marine" Davis, the person pictured on the cover. Robert told Mojo magazine, "My personal favorite: a weird record, almost a concept album, about the typical Ohio male and what he does - drink, watch television, eat pizza. It got mixed reviews; there are people who hate it and others who think it's our best record and I'm on their side. I just love the songs. It feels like one piece, like it all fits together. I like the cover and I like the whole package."

Pollard has also stated he would like to work on a second Kid Marine (Kid Marine 2) at some point in the future, exploring similar themes and concepts.

Track listing
"Submarine Teams"   – 4:55  
"Flings of the Waistcoat Crowd"   – 1:42  
"The Big Make-Over"   – 1:56  
"Men Who Create Fright"   – 2:11  
"Television Prison"   – 1:57  
"Strictly Comedy"   – 1:40  
"Far-Out Crops"   – 3:30  
"Living Upside Down"   – 2:14  
"Snatch Candy"   – 1:33  
"White Gloves Come Off"   – 2:27  
"Enjoy Jerusalem!"   – 2:16  
"You Can't Hold Your Women"   – 1:52  
"Town of Mirrors"   – 3:12  
"Powerblessings"   – 1:54  
"Island Crimes"   – 3:49

Personnel

Musicians 

 Robert Pollard – lead vocals, keyboard, guitar, violin (track 4)
 Greg Demos – bass guitar
 Jim Macpherson – drums
 Tobin Sprout – piano (track 7)
 Kim Pollard – vocals (track 5)
 Jim Pollard – sound effects (track 2)

Technical 

 John Shough – engineering 
 Greg Demos – engineering (track 2, 11)
 Tobin Sprout – engineering (track 14)
 Jeff Graham – mastering
 Nick Kizirnis – layout
 Pam Stacey – photography

References 

1999 albums
Robert Pollard albums